Hyacinthus orientalis, the common hyacinth, garden hyacinth or Dutch hyacinth, is a species of flowering plant in the family Asparagaceae, subfamily Scilloideae, native to southwestern Asia, southern and central Turkey, northwestern Syria, Lebanon and northern Israel. It was introduced to Europe in the 16th century. It is widely cultivated everywhere in the temperate world for its strongly fragrant flowers which appear exceptionally early in the season, and frequently forced to flower at Christmas time.

Description
It is a bulbous plant, with a  diameter bulb.

Mythology
In Greek mythology, Hyacinth was a young man admired by Apollo and Zephyr, but killed by a discus in a jealous fight between the two gods; a flower was allegedly named after him when it sprang from his blood. However, Theophrastus describes both a cultivated and a wild plant called , neither of which are considered to be the modern hyacinth.

Reproduction

The reproduction of the plant in cultivation can be done easily by dividing the newly appeared bulbs from the main plant. In nature, this method is also used by the hyacinth, but the plant also has a specific kind of reproduction by seeds.

The plant is pollinated by different insects such as honey bees. The flowers are very fragrant and attract the insects by rewarding them with nectar.

After flowering, the ripening of the seed capsules begins. They are fleshy, spherical structures. When the capsules reach maturity, they get dried and split into three parts. Each part has two subdivisions and contains a different quantity of seeds. The seeds are black grains with one white elaiosome of variable size. The seeds are dispersed through myrmecochory; that is, ants find the seeds and take them into their burrows, where they use the elaiosome for food. There, the seeds can germinate.

Cultivation

H. orientalis has a long history of cultivation as an ornamental plant, grown across the Mediterranean region, and later France (where it is used in perfumery), the Netherlands (a major centre of cultivation) and elsewhere.

It flowers in the early spring, growing best in full sun to part shade in well-drained, but not dry, soil. It requires a winter dormancy period, and will only persist in cold-weather regions. It is grown for the clusters of strongly fragrant, brightly coloured flowers. Over 2,000 cultivars have been selected and named, with flower colour in shades of blue, white, pale yellow, pink, red or purple; most cultivars have also been selected for denser flower spikes than the wild type, bearing 40–100 or more flowers on each spike.

Cultivars

The following cultivars have gained the Royal Horticultural Society's Award of Garden Merit:- 

'Aida' (deep blue)
'Anna Marie' (pink)
'Blue Festival' (pale blue)
'Blue Jacket' (blue)
'Chicago' (violet blue)
'City of Haarlem' (cream)
'Delft Blue' (blue)
'Fairly' (white)
'Gipsy Queen' (salmon pink)
'Jan Bos' (deep pink)
'L'Innocence' (white)
'Miss Saigon' (deep pink)
'Ostara' (blue)
'Paul Hermann' (mauve-pink)

'Royal Navy' (dark blue)
'Yellow Queen' (cream yellow)

Forcing
Hyacinths are among the most popular bulbs selected for the process known as forcing, whereby plants are induced to flower earlier than their natural season (in this case, Christmas). It involves depriving bulbs of light and warmth for a period of several weeks, before growing them on in a bright, cool place such as a kitchen windowsill. It is possible to grow the bulbs in a narrow-necked vase of water, thus being able to view the root growth. Alternatively, bulbs can be purchased pre-forced.

Toxicity
H. orientalis contains alkaloids and is toxic if eaten in large quantities.  The bulb, however, is the most poisonous part and should not be ingested under any circumstances.

See also
 List of poisonous plants

References

External links
 
Newsletter Number 4. (October 2004) Hyacinth perennialization ,   Flower Bulb Research Program,    Department of Horticulture, College of Agriculture and Life Sciences, Cornell University

Scilloideae
Garden plants
Flora of Lebanon
Flora of Western Asia
Plants described in 1753
Taxa named by Carl Linnaeus